Samuel Alexander Muggleton (born 17 November 1995) is an English footballer who plays as a defender or midfielder for Belper Town.

Career

Early career
Muggleton was born in Melton Mowbray, Leicestershire and is the son of former footballer Carl Muggleton. He played for his local team Syston before joining Leicester City. He played for Leicester for several seasons at various youth levels before being released, being told he was too short. After this, he joined Holwell Sports, where he played for the first team in the East Midlands Counties League.

Aged 16, he signed a two-year scholarship with Gillingham in November 2012. He made his first-team debut for Gillingham on the final day of the 2012–13 season, starting in a 3–2 away defeat to Burton Albion, as they were crowned champions of League Two.

Muggleton joined Conference Premier club Barnet on 27 March 2014 on loan until the end of 2013–14. After making six appearances, he returned to Gillingham. He was released by Gillingham at the end of 2013–14, signing for Barnet permanently on 16 May 2014.

Non-league
On 17 January 2017, Muggleton signed for National League club Eastleigh for an undisclosed fee.

On 20 March 2017, Muggleton signed for Eastleigh's National League rivals York City on a contract until the end of 2016–17. He joined York's National League North rivals Boston United on 21 October 2017 on a one-month loan. He made his debut the same day, starting in Boston's 2–1 away defeat to Curzon Ashton. Muggleton returned to York after the loan expired, having made six appearances for Boston. On 9 February 2018, he joined Northern Premier League Division One North club Scarborough Athletic on loan for the rest of the 2017–18 season. He made eight appearances as York finished 2017–18 in 11th place in the table. He was released at the end of the season.

Muggleton signed for newly relegated National League club Chesterfield on 31 July 2018 on a one-year contract with the option of a further year. He joined National League North club Darlington on 8 February 2019 on a one-month loan. During his second appearance, he collided with an opponent and suffered a broken femur and three ruptured ligaments and a torn tendon in his left knee. Muggleton was released by Chesterfield at the end of the season.

He played on trial for Kettering Town in September 2020 as he sought to regain full fitness. Later that month he signed for Southern Football League club Stratford Town. The 2020–21 season was again curtailed due to Covid-19 and in the summer of 2021 he dropped down a level to sign for Northern Premier League Division One Midlands side Bedworth United. He transferred to division rivals in February 2022 when he signed for Belper Town and was a part of the side that beat Chasetown 1–0 in the play-off final to earn promotion to the Premier Division.

Style of play
Muggleton plays as a left back or a left midfielder and possesses a long throw-in.

Career statistics

Honours
Barnet
Conference Premier: 2014–15

References

External links

Profile at the Chesterfield F.C. website

1995 births
Living people
Sportspeople from Melton Mowbray
Footballers from Leicestershire
English footballers
Association football defenders
Association football midfielders
Leicester City F.C. players
Holwell Sports F.C. players
Gillingham F.C. players
Barnet F.C. players
Eastleigh F.C. players
York City F.C. players
Boston United F.C. players
Scarborough Athletic F.C. players
Chesterfield F.C. players
Darlington F.C. players
Stratford Town F.C. players
Bedworth United F.C. players
Belper Town F.C. players
English Football League players
National League (English football) players
Northern Premier League players
Southern Football League players
East Midlands Counties Football League players